Ronald McDonald House New York (RMH-NY) is a children's 501(c)(3) charity located at 405 East 73rd Street (between First Avenue and York Avenue), on the Upper East Side in Manhattan in New York City.  It provides temporary accommodation for the families of children ages 0–26 undergoing treatment for pediatric cancer, and is the only facility in New York City to provide post-transplant suites outside of a hospital.

The House was officially incorporated in 1979 as 26 room facility. It has now grown to be a 95-room, 11-story,  red brick building that was built in 1989 by the Spector Group.  A "Fred Lebow Room" has been dedicated at the House.

The House has provided support to over 35,000 families from over 70 countries in its 95 suites. RMH-NY provides not only a place for families to stay but many amenities, programs and support services, such as meals, transportation, tutoring and wellness programs. Additionally, an extensive lineup of activities and events for guests of all ages and backgrounds are offered every day. After long days of treatment, these programs help give children and their families a break and much-needed relief.

As of 2017, the President & Chief Executive Officer is Ruth C. Browne.

The House accepts and relies upon thousands of volunteers, as well as canine volunteers, in addition to its full-time staff.

See also
Ronald McDonald House Charities (United States)
Ronald McDonald House Charities Canada

References

External links
 Ronald McDonald House New York Official Website
 Ronald McDonald House (New York, N.Y.), The Ronald McDonald House of NYC cookbook, Gryphon III Design Co. (1994)

Organizations established in 1978
McDonald's charities
Organizations for children with health issues
Charities based in New York City
Health charities in the United States
Upper East Side
1978 establishments in New York City
Medical and health organizations based in New York City